Guns and Roses: Ik Junoon (Urdu script: گنز اینڈ روزز—اک جنون  "Guns and Roses, an Obsession") is a 1999 Pakistani film directed by & starring Shaan (in his feature directorial debut), Resham, Meera and Faisal Rehman. The film music was composed by M Arshad. 

The movie is mainly known for its soundtrack which included hits like Jeena  Hai Jeena Tau Hai, Khat, and Qeher and its action sequences. Tanvir Fatima Rehman produced the film.

See also 
 film Pal Do Pal (1999 film)

References

1999 films
Urdu-language Pakistani films
Pakistani romance films
Pakistani action films
Films directed by Shaan Shahid
1990s Urdu-language films